Frenchs Flat is a flat along the divide of the Diablo Range south of Pacheco Pass in Santa Clara County, California.

History 
Frenchs Flat was along the route of La Vereda del Monte used by Joaquin Murrieta and his gang to drive their droves of wild and stolen horses through here on their way south to their depot and ranch at Cantua Creek and ultimately to Sonora.

References 

Landforms of Santa Clara County, California
Diablo Range
La Vereda del Monte